Ernst Masik (also Ernst Maasik; 1 December 1890 Helme Parish (now Tõrva Parish), Kreis Fellin – 18 December 1949 Tavda, Sverdlovsk Oblast, Russian SFSR) was an Estonian politician. He was a member of II Riigikogu. He was a member of the Riigikogu since 5 October 1925. He replaced Johannes Gutmann.

References

1890 births
1949 deaths
People from Tõrva Parish
People from Kreis Fellin
Farmers' Assemblies politicians
Members of the Riigikogu, 1923–1926
Estonian people who died in Soviet detention